is an exercising action role-playing game developed and published by Nintendo for the Nintendo Switch. The game comes with two physical components: the Ring-Con, a Pilates ring that the user holds and one Joy-Con slots into, and a Leg Strap, a piece of fabric affixed to the user's leg that holds the other Joy-Con.

The game's main mode has the player complete a turn-based role-playing game, where player movements and battle actions are based on performing certain physical activities using the Ring-Con and Leg Strap, with the motion controls within the Joy-Con sensing the player's movement, and a strain sensor in the Ring-Con detecting bending of that accessory. Other modes include general guided fitness routines and party-style games. These activities are centered around common fitness exercises, making the game part of Nintendo's "quality of life" goals in line with a similar game of theirs, Wii Fit. The game was released worldwide on October 18, 2019, and received generally positive reviews from critics. As of June 30, 2022, the game has sold over 14.54 million copies worldwide, making it one of the best-selling games on the system.

Demand for the game increased drastically during 2020, largely due to the COVID-19 pandemic and related closures of gyms and other exercise facilities, causing shortages in many countries. This led to resellers in America selling the game for over $300, up from its retail price of $80.

Gameplay

Ring Fit Adventure ships with the Ring-Con and Leg Strap, which have docks to hold the Switch's Joy-Con. These accessories are required to play the game, as the player's interactions with them are tracked by the motion controls built into the Joy-Con.

The game's main mode is a role-playing game, in which the player takes the role of a young athlete that meets a sentient Ring, and they team up to take down an evil, bodybuilding dragon named Dragaux. The player moves their character across the game's overworld and into various dungeons, where they encounter monsters to fight. Moving across the game world is similar to a rail shooter; the player moves along a fixed path by running in place, jumps over obstacles by squeezing and releasing the Ring-Con, and can fire projectiles at items by squeezing the Ring-Con in the target direction. When the player encounters monsters, the game uses turn-based combat as in many role-playing games. The player attacks the enemies by performing one of about thirty different exercises, with the amount of damage they deal based on how effectively they completed the exercise. When the monsters attack, the player can defend by pressing and holding the Ring-Con into their abdomen for as long as possible during the attack. Defeating monsters earn the player-character experience points, and as they level up, they can unlock additional exercises with more potent damage. Exercises are classified by color, each color corresponding to a general part of the body the exercise is geared towards: red for arms, blue for legs, yellow for core muscles and green for yoga positions. Monsters are also marked by colors, and exercises of the same color are more effective against them, but only after that specific ability is unlocked early in the game.

In addition to the adventure mode, the game includes a general fitness routine mode that allows one to perform the exercises, assisted by the game, but without the gamification elements. The game also has several mini-games based on certain exercises, which can be used by a single player to challenge themselves or can be used with multiple players each taking a turn to beat the others. An update in late March 2020 also added a "Rhythm Mode", which allows the user to move along to soundtrack from the game. This mode also includes some music from other Nintendo games such as Super Mario Odyssey, The Legend of Zelda: Breath of the Wild, Splatoon 2, and Wii Fit.

The game includes the option to enable only quiet exercises to avoid disturbing others nearby. For example, in quiet mode, the running-in-place in the adventure mode is replaced by performing squats.

Development
The game was first teased in early September 2019 with a video showing people using the Ring-Con and Leg Strap without showing the game, with a full announcement of the game a week later.

Several journalists observed that the game fits into Nintendo's long-running "quality of life" program, to introduce more physical activity into the playing of video games, that had been started by Satoru Iwata with the introduction of the Wii console, particularly in the game Wii Fit. Parts of the design of the Nintendo Switch had been from player feedback from Wii Fit looking to make the controllers smaller so they could be strapped to the body and used in more possible ways.

Ring Fit Adventure was released in North America on October 18, 2019. The game, shipping with the Ring-Con and Leg Strap, costs slightly more than a typical game.

On March 26, 2020, a free update was released, adding a rhythm game mode.

Reception 

Ring Fit Adventure received "generally favorable" reviews, according to review aggregator Metacritic, with a score of 83/100. It has also been rated on IGN as 7.8/10. Many critics agree that while Ring Fit Adventure is not designed for strength training, it is effective exercise for maintaining fitness. The RPG elements of the game are very simplistic, which allows casual players to play the game with ease, but which can be disappointing for fans of RPGs who want more of a strategic challenge.

Sales 
Ring Fit Adventure debuted at #3 in the UK, and #1 in Japan and South Korea. In Japan, it sold 68,497 copies within its first week on sale, which placed it at number one on the all format sales chart. By December 2019, the game had shipped  units worldwide.

Due to the COVID-19 pandemic, demand for the game increased significantly, creating shortages.

On June 18, 2020, it was confirmed that Ring Fit Adventure had sold over one million copies in Japan, where it shipped a total of 1,006,069 copies across the region.

From launch to September 2020, the game has sold  units worldwide.

By March 31, 2021, sales reached 10.11 million copies.

As of March 31, 2022, the game sold 14.09 million copies making it one of the best-selling Nintendo Switch games.

By June 30, 2022, 14.54 million copies of the game were sold.

Awards 
The game was nominated for "Best Family Game" at The Game Awards 2019, for "Family Game of the Year" at the 23rd Annual D.I.C.E. Awards, and for "Game Beyond Entertainment" at the 16th British Academy Games Awards.

Potential benefits of Exergames 
Exergames such as Wii Fit, Kinect, and Ring Fit itself have received research in recent years due to their potential for therapeutic aid and for heath benefit. Studies have shown potential use of exergaming in lowering B.M.I and improving mobility especially in older individuals.

Notes

References

External links 
Official website (UK)
Official website

2019 video games
Fitness games
Nintendo Switch games
Nintendo Entertainment Planning & Development games
Nintendo games
Nintendo Switch-only games
Role-playing video games
Video games developed in Japan
Impact of the COVID-19 pandemic on the video game industry